Robeson may refer to:

Robeson Channel
Robeson County, North Carolina
Robeson Township, Pennsylvania

People with the surname 
Eslanda Goode Robeson (1895–1965), wife and business manager of singer Paul Robeson
George M. Robeson (1829–1897), American politician and lawyer
Kenneth Robeson, house name used by Street and Smith Publications
Paul Robeson (1898–1976), American entertainer and activist
Paul Robeson, Jr. (1927–2014), his son, an author, archivist and historian

See also
Robison (disambiguation)
Roberson (disambiguation)

Patronymic surnames